Adrián Chávez Ortiz (born 27 June 1962) is a Mexican former footballer who played as a goalkeeper.

Early life
Chávez was born on 27 June 1962 in Mexico City, Mexico. His father was Al Pinkston, an American baseball player who was playing for Rojos del Aguila de Veracruz of the Mexican League at the time of his birth. Pinkston wanted to take Chávez with him back to the U.S., but his mother wouldn't allow it, going as far as changing Chávez's name to prevent him from doing so. Chávez never met Pinkston in person, but in 1982 he attempted to reach out to him after learning of his heritage, only to find out that he had died a year earlier.

Club career
Chávez played club football for Necaxa, América, Atlante and Universidad Nacional. He spent most of his 20-year career with América.

International career
At international level he played for Mexico.

References

External links

1962 births
Living people
Footballers from Mexico City
Association football goalkeepers
Mexican footballers
Mexico under-20 international footballers
Mexico international footballers
1991 CONCACAF Gold Cup players
1994 FIFA World Cup players
1995 King Fahd Cup players
Atlético Español footballers
Club Necaxa footballers
Club León footballers
Club América footballers
Atlante F.C. footballers
Atlético Celaya footballers
Cruz Azul footballers
Club Universidad Nacional footballers
Liga MX players